Balkania was the trade name of 'K. Zacharopoulos A.B.E.E.' a Greek industrial and trading company based in Athens that produced 4x4 jeep-type vehicles and 4x4 trucks. Since 1945, K. Zacharopoulos had been involved in vehicle repair and rebuilding. The Balkania company was founded in 1954 and since 1972 it imported Romanian and Indian vehicles. In 1979 the model was redesigned, with a modern synthetic (glass-fiber reinforced composite) cabin. It was produced, as some similar Greek vehicles, until a change of a favorable categorization for agricultural vehicles in 1984 limited its prospects (see also AutoDiana, Petropoulos). The vehicle was modestly successful, as it exhibited certain quality problems. 

In 1975 Balkania also introduced a lighter Autotractor series of Jeep-type 4x4 vehicles. These were not of own design, but were actually modified Indian Mahindra models (in turn based on older U.S. Jeep models), using a Peugeot 2100 cc  Diesel engine. The more modern-looking Autotractor KZ (from the founder's name initials) was available with the aforementioned engine, as well as a Peugeot 2500 cc  gasoline engine. In 1984 the company was partially acquired by Mahindra & Mahindra, the factory was modernized and its name was changed to Mahindra Hellas A.E.. The model name Autotractor was dropped and all vehicles produced were Mahindra models sold with that name, although in somewhat modified versions. Most of this production was exported. The company went out of business in 1995.

References 
L.S. Skartsis and G.A. Avramidis, 'Made in Greece', Typorama, Patras, Greece (2003)  (republished by the University of Patras Science Park, 2007).
L.S. Skartsis, "Greek Vehicle & Machine Manufacturers 1800 to present: A Pictorial History", Marathon (2012)  (eBook)

External links 
Trucks of the world
Dutch auto catalog

Greek companies established in 1954
Vehicle manufacturing companies established in 1954
1995 disestablishments in Greece
Vehicle manufacturing companies disestablished in 1995
Defunct truck manufacturers
Off-road vehicles
All-wheel-drive vehicles
Truck manufacturers of Greece
Defunct motor vehicle manufacturers of Greece
Manufacturing companies based in Athens
1984 mergers and acquisitions